A Matter of Morals is a 1961 American drama film directed by John Cromwell and written by John D. Hess. The film stars Maj-Britt Nilsson, Mogens Wieth, Eva Dahlbeck, Patrick O'Neal and Claes Thelander. The film was released on May 31, 1961, by United Artists.

Plot

Cast 
Maj-Britt Nilsson as Anita Andersson
Mogens Wieth as Erik Walderman
Eva Dahlbeck as Eva Walderman
Patrick O'Neal as Alan Kennebeck
Claes Thelander as Björnson
Lennart Lindberg as Sven Arborg
Vernon Young as Mr. Henderson
Doreen Denning as Mrs. Henderson
Gösta Cederlund as Curt Eklund
Hampe Faustman as Kronstad
Birger Lensander as Taxi Driver
Per-Axel Arosenius as Taxi Driver
Tord Peterson as Nightwatch

References

External links 
 

1961 films
United Artists films
American drama films
1961 drama films
Films directed by John Cromwell
Films scored by Dag Wirén
1960s English-language films
1960s American films